"The Sacred War", also known as "Arise, Great Country!" is one of the most famous Soviet songs of the World War II. The music is by Alexander Alexandrov, founder of the Alexandrov Ensemble and the musical composer of the State Anthem of the Soviet Union. The lyrics are by Vasily Lebedev-Kumach.

The circumstances of the composition and first performance of the song were hurried; the lyrics were published on 24 June 1941, and Alexandrov immediately wrote the music for them, writing the notes out on a blackboard for the singers to copy manually. The first performance was on 26 June at Belorussky Railway Station, where according to eyewitnesses it was sung five times in succession.

These claims were taken to court, and the newspaper Nezavisimaya Gazeta in June 2000 was forced to publish a retraction of the claim. Prof. Evgeniy Levashev (2000) still upheld doubts on the authorship, and on the reasonableness of the court's decision.

Lyrics

Notes

References

External links
 Song "The Sacred War" performed by the chorus of the People's Liberation Army of China 
 Lyrics and recording, 1942 recording (sovmusic.ru)
 German lyrics by Hermlin (erinnerungsort.de)
 The Sacred War by Russia Insight on YouTube link : https://m.youtube.com/watch?v=Il3FJMf4mSE

Russian military marches
Songs of World War II
Russian patriotic songs
Anti-fascist music
Soviet songs
Russian military songs
1941 songs